Great Expectations is a British-American television serial based on Charles Dickens' 1861 novel of the same title. The  serial was first broadcast in the US in three parts on The Disney Channel in 1989, and in the UK in six parts on the ITV network in 1991.

Jean Simmons, who played the role of the young Estella in the 1946 movie, played Miss Havisham in the 1989 version. Other key roles include John Rhys-Davies as Joe Gargery, Ray McAnally as Jaggers, Anthony Calf as the adult Pip, Kim Thomson as both young and adult Estella, Adam Blackwood as Herbert Pocket, Anthony Hopkins as Abel Magwitch, Niven Boyd as Orlick, Susan Franklyn as Biddy and Martin Harvey as young Pip. Having the same actress play Estella as a child and adult provided a smoother transition in following the character than in some adaptations.

Serial format
The drama serial format, running five hours, enabled much more of the original story to be filmed than other versions, allowed the restoration of significant characters omitted in other versions, such as Orlick and Wopsle, and the better examination of the roles of other characters, such as Biddy, Drummle, Miss Havisham and the adult Estella. The result is more understandable plot development, and the revelation of themes of the work that tend to be obscured in shorter versions, such as class striving and the values of character vs. wealth. This version takes relatively few liberties with characters and plot turns, and adheres closely to Dickens' published ending.

Plot summary

Cast
 Anthony Hopkins as Magwitch
 Jean Simmons as Miss Havisham
 John Rhys-Davies as Joe Gargery
 Ray McAnally as Mr Jaggers
 Anthony Calf as Pip
 Kim Thomson as Estella
 Adam Blackwood as Herbert
 Martin Harvey as Young Pip
 Susan Franklyn as Biddy
 Rosemary McHale as Mrs Gargery
 Niven Boyd as Orlick
 Sean Arnold as Compeyson
 Frank Middlemass as Uncle Pumplechook
 John Quentin as Mr Wopsle
 Preston Lockwood as Mr Hubble
 Eve Pearce as Mrs Hubble
 Simon Warwick as Startop

Locations
  
Harty Church on the Isle of Sheppey in Kent was used for the moment when young orphan Pip, whilst visiting his parents' grave, meets the escaped convict, Abel Magwitch. Upnor Village was used as the home of Herbert Pocket's fiancée Clara's house. Upnor Lighthouse is visible as Pip docks in the village.

References

External links 
 

Films based on Great Expectations
Films shot at Pinewood Studios
Television series produced at Pinewood Studios
1991 British television series debuts
1991 British television series endings
1990s British drama television series
ITV television dramas
1990s British television miniseries
Television shows based on Great Expectations
English-language television shows
Television series by ITV Studios
Television shows produced by Harlech Television (HTV)
Television shows set in Kent
Films directed by Kevin Connor